"What Christmas Means to Me" is the name of several different Christmas songs.  The most-covered version was written by Allen Story, Anna Gordy Gaye, and George Gordy. It has been recorded by many artists, including:

 Stevie Wonder (1967) on Someday at Christmas 
 Paul Young (1992) on A Very Special Christmas 2 
 Hanson (1997) on Snowed In 
 Mary-Kate and Ashley Olsen with Sean Holt (1999) on Cool Yule: A Christmas Party With Friends  
 En Vogue (2002) on The Gift of Christmas 
 Holiday Express (2002) on Live 
 Jessica Simpson (2004) on ReJoyce: The Christmas Album 
 Natalie Grant (2005) on Believe 
 Charm City Sound (2007) on Christmas Lights 
 Darlene Love (2007) on It's Christmas, Of Course 
 Mandisa (2007) on Christmas Joy EP - also appeared on It's Christmas in 2008 
 Jason Yeager (2008) on My Christmas Wish 
 Overboard (2008) on Tidings 
 Sensational Soul Cruisers (2008) on Save Your Soul EP
 Rahsaan Patterson (2008) on The Ultimate Gift 
 Michael McDonald (2009) on This Christmas - listed as "That's What Christmas Means to Me"
 Karel King (2010) on Lights, Love, and Laughter 
 Trijntje Oosterhuis (2010) on This Is The Season 
 University of Wisconsin Madhatters (2010) on Cheer On Tap
 Nick Lachey featuring The Sing-Off Contestants (2010) on The Sing Off: Season 2, Episode 5, The Finale
 Coastline (2011) on An Undeniably Merry Coastline Christmas 
 J Grace (2011) on Christmas Eve  
 CeeLo Green (2012) on Cee Lo's Magic Moment 
 The Empty Pockets (2012) on A Holiday Staycation
 Rhonda Thomas (2012) on Little Drummer Girl 
 Klarc Whitson
 Sugarlick
 Sugar Beats on A Sugar Beats Christmas - Cool Christmas Songs for Kids 
 Ballroom Orchestra & Singers
 Jennette McCurdy in the 2012 Macy's Thanksgiving Day Parade.
 Two Angels (2013) on "How Angels celebrate Christmas"
 Train (2015) on Christmas in Tahoe
 The Mrs (2015) single release
 Straight No Chaser (2016) on I'll Have Another... Christmas Album
 Pentatonix (2018) on Christmas Is Here!
 John Legend (2018) on A Legendary Christmas
 Gaia (2021) single release
 Joss Stone (2022) single release

Similar titles
 "What Christmas Means to Me" - written by Chiquita Mullins, Claude Hill, Moses Dillard, and Sharon Michalsky
 Al Green (1983) on The Christmas Album - also appeared on White Christmas in 1986
 "What Christmas Means to Me" - written by Steve Romanoff 
 Schooner Fare (1987) on Home for the Holidays
 "What Christmas Means to Me" - written by Joey Miskulin 
 Frankie Yankovic (1994) on Christmas Memories
 "What Christmas Means to Me" - written by Bob Stewart 
 Karen Newman (1994) on What Christmas Means to Me
 "What Christmas Means to Me" - written by Amayz
 Amayz (2007) on Everyday Like Christmas
 "That's What Christmas Means to Me" - written by Nick Acquaviva and Ted Varnick
 Eddie Fisher (1952) on Christmas with Eddie Fisher
 "That's What Christmas Means to Me" - written by Wendell B
 Wendell B (2007) on Save a Little Room for Me
 "That's What Christmas Means to Me" - written by Harry Revel
 Featured in the film It Happened on Fifth Avenue (1947)
 "That's What Christmas Means to Me" - written by Jerome Schoolar 
 Biscuit Brothers (2007) on Have a Merry Musical Christmas

References

1967 songs
American Christmas songs
Jessica Simpson songs
Stevie Wonder songs
Songs written by Anna Gordy Gaye
Songs written by George Gordy